Vogue Greece is the Greek edition of the fashion and lifestyle magazine Vogue. The magazine is published by Condé Nast International.

History 
In March 2000, Vogue Hellas started publication in Greece by Lyberis Publications. In 2012, Lyberis went bankrupt and the magazine ceased publication.

On March 31, 2019 (with the first issue in April), Vogue Greece was brought back by Condé Nast International in partnership with Kathimerines Ekdoseis. The editor-in-chief of the magazine is Thaleia Karafyllidou.

References 

Vogue (magazine)
2000 establishments in Greece
Magazines established in 2000
Magazines published in Greece
Magazines established in 2019
Magazines disestablished in 2012
Greek-language magazines
Condé Nast magazines